Unge hjerter (Young Hearts) is a Norwegian silent film from 1917. It is considered lost. According to the cinematographer Ottar Gladtvet, who described the filming in his autobiography, parts of the film were shot outside Røros at Easter.

The film premiered at the Palace Theater on June 9, 1917.

Plot
An engaged couple (Harriet Wold and Ragnar Berntzen) have both fallen in love with someone else: Wang and Anna. They confess this to each other, worried about the other's reaction. However, when it turns out that both are in the same situation, there are new engagements and joy.

Cast
 ? Kittelsen as Harriet Wold
 Henning Eriksen as Ragnar Berntzen
 Jens Selmer as the priest
 Gunvor Arntzen as Anna, the priest's daughter
 Kaare Knudsen as Wang
 Robert Sperati as a Sami
 Hildur Øverland as the priest's housekeeper

References

External links

Unge hjerter at the National Library of Norway
Unge hjerter at Filmfront

1917 films
Norwegian romance films
Norwegian black-and-white films
Norwegian silent films
Lost Norwegian films
1917 lost films